Rajaraja I (Middle Tamil: Rājarāja Cōḻaṉ; Classical Sanskrit: Rājarāja Cōla; 947 CE – 1014 CE), often described as Rajaraja the Great, or Mummudi Chola (Middle Tamil: Mum'muṭi Cōḻaṉ) as was a Chola emperor who reigned from 985 CE to 1014 CE. He was the most powerful Tamil king in South India during his reign and is remembered for reinstating the Chola influence and ensuring its supremacy across the Indian Ocean.

His extensive empire included vast regions of the Pandya country, the Chera country and northern Sri Lanka. He also acquired Lakshadweep and Thiladhunmadulu atoll, and part of the northern-most islands of the Maldives in the Indian Ocean. Campaigns against the Western Gangas and the Chalukyas extended the Chola authority as far as the Tungabhadra River. On the eastern coast, he battled with the Chalukyas for the possession of Vengi.

Rajaraja I, being an able administrator, also built the great Rajarajeshwaram Temple at the Chola capital Thanjavur. The temple is regarded as the foremost of all temples constructed in the medieval south Indian architectural style. During his reign, the texts of the Tamil poets Appar, Sambandar and Sundarar were collected and edited into one compilation called Thirumurai. He initiated a massive project of land survey and assessment in 1000 CE which led to the reorganisation of the country into individual units known as valanadus. Rajaraja died in 1014 CE and was succeeded by his son Rajendra Chola I.

Early life 

Rajaraja was a son of the Chola king Parantaka II (alias Sundara) and queen Vanavan Mahadevi. According to the Thiruvalangadu copper-plate inscription, his birth name was Arulmoḻi (also transliterated as Arulmozhi) Varman, literally "blessed tongued". He was born around 947 CE in the Aipassi month, on the day of Sadhayam star. He had an elder brother – Aditya II, and an elder sister – Kundavai.

Rajaraja's ascension ended a period of rival claims to the throne, following the death of his great-grandfather Parantaka I. After Parantaka I, his elder son Gandaraditya ascended the throne. At the time of Gandaraditya's death, his son Uttama was a minor, so the throne passed on to Parantaka I's younger son Arinjaya. Arinjaya died soon, and was succeeded by his son Parantaka II. It was decided that the throne would pass on to Uttama after Parantaka II: this decision was most probably that of Parantaka II, although the Thiruvalangadu inscription of Rajaraja's son Rajendra I claims that it was made by Rajaraja.

Rajaraja's elder brother died before him, and after the death of Uttama, Rajaraja ascended the throne in June–July 985. Known as Arumoḷi Varman until this point, he adopted the regnal name Rajaraja, which literally means "King among Kings".

Military conquests 

Rajaraja inherited a kingdom whose boundaries were limited to the traditional Chola territory centred around Thanjavur-Tiruchirappalli region. At the time of his ascension, the Chola kingdom was relatively small, and was still recovering from the Rashtrakuta invasions in the preceding years. Rajaraja turned it into an efficiently administered empire which possessed a powerful army and a strong navy. During his reign, the northern kingdom of Vengi became a Chola protectorate, and the Chola influence on the eastern coast extended as far as Kalinga in the north.

A number of regiments are mentioned in the Thanjavur inscriptions. These regiments were divided into elephant troops, cavalry and infantry and each of these regiments had its own autonomy and was free to endow benefactions or build temples.

Against Kandalur Salai 

Rajaraja's earliest inscriptions celebrate a major victory at Kandalur Salai (in present-day Kerala) in c. 988 CE, calling him "Kāndalūr śālai Kalam-arutta" ("the one who destroyed Kandalur Salai"). The Salai originally belonged to the Ay chief, a vassal of the Pandya king at Madurai. Involvement of either Chera or Pandya warriors in this battle remains uncertain. The Thiruvalangadu inscription mentions that Rajaraja's general captured Vizhinjam (Viḷinam): this conquest may have been a part of the Kandalur Salai campaign. The engagement seems to have been an effort of the Chola navy or a combined effort of the navy and the army.

Conquest of Kerala and the Pandyas 

Rajaraja's inscriptions start to appear in Kanyakumari district in the 990s and in Trivandrum district in early 1000s. The Chola subjugation of Kerala can be dated to the early years of the 11th century. The Senur inscription (1005 CE) of Rajaraja states that he destroyed the Pandya capital Madurai; conquered the "haughty kings" of Kollam (Venad), Kolla-desham (Mushika), and Kodungallur (the Chera Perumal). Some of these victories in Malainadu were perhaps won by prince Rajendra Chola for his father.

After defeating the Pandyas, Rajaraja adopted the title Pandya Kulashani ("Thunderbolt to the Race of the Pandyas"), and the Pandya country came to be known as "Rajaraja Mandalam" or "Rajaraja Pandinadu". While describing the Rajaraja's campaign in trisanku kastha (the south), the Thiruvalangadu Grant of Rajendra I states that he seized certain royal Amarabhujanga. Identification of this prince (either a Pandya prince or a general of the Pandya king or a Kongu Chera prince) remains unresolved. Kongu Desa Rajakkal, a chronicle of the Kongu Nadu region, suggests that this general later shifted his allegiance to Rajaraja, and performed the Chola king's kanakabhisheka ceremony.

After consolidating his rule in the south, Rajaraja assumed the title Mummudi Chola, meaning three Crowned a reference to his control over the three ancient Tamil countries of the Cholas, the Pandyas, and the Cheras.

Conquest of Sri Lanka 

In 993, Rajaraja invaded Sri Lanka, which is called Ila-mandalam in the Chola records. This invasion most probably happened during the reign of Mahinda V of Anuradhapura, who according to the Chulavamsa chronicle, had fled to Rohana (Ruhuna) in south-eastern Sri Lanka because of a military uprising. The Chola army sacked Anuradhapura, and captured the northern half of Sri Lanka. The Cholas established a provincial capital at the military outpost of Polonnaruwa, naming it Jananathamangalam after a title of Rajaraja. The Chola official Tali Kumaran erected a Shiva temple called Rajarajeshwara ("Lord of Rajaraja") in the town of Mahatirtha (modern Mantota), which was renamed Rajarajapura.

Comparing Rajaraja's campaign to the invasion of Lanka by the legendary hero Rama, the Thiruvalangadu Plates states:

In 1017, Rajaraja's son Rajendra I completed the Chola conquest of Sri Lanka. The Cholas controlled Sri Lanka until 1070, when Vijayabahu I defeated and expelled them.

Chalukyan conflict 
In 998 CE, Rajaraja captured the regions of Gangapadi, Nolambapadi and Tadigaipadi (present day Karnataka). Raja Chola extinguished the Nolambas, who were the feudatories of Ganga while conquering and annexing Nolambapadi. The conquered provinces were originally feudatories of the Rashtrakutas. In 973 CE, the Rashtrakutas were defeated by the Western Chalukyas leading to direct conflict with Cholas. An inscription of Irivabedanga Satyashraya from Dharwar describes him as a vassal of the Western Chalukyas and acknowledges the Chola onslaught. In the same inscription, he accuses Rajendra of having arrived with a force of 955,000 and of having gone on rampage in Donuwara thereby blurring the moralities of war as laid out in the Dharmasastras. Historians like James Heitzman and Wolfgang Schenkluhn conclude that this confrontation displayed the degree of animosity on a personal level between the rulers of the Chola and the Chalukya kingdoms drawing a parallel between the enmity between the Chalukyas of Badami and the Pallavas of Kanchi.

By 1004 CE, the Gangavadi province was conquered by Rajaraja. The Changalvas who ruled over the western part of the Gangavadi province and the Kongalvas who ruled over Kodagu were turned into vassals. The Chola general Panchavan Maraya who defeated the Changalvas in the battle of Ponnasoge and distinguished himself in this affair was rewarded with Arkalgud Yelusuvira-7000 territory and the title Kshatriyasikhamani. The Kongalvas, for the heroism of Manya, were rewarded with the estate of Malambi (Coorg) and the title Kshatriyasikhamani. Vengi kingdom was ruled by Jata Choda Bhima of the Eastern Chalukyas dynasty. Jata Choda Bhima was defeated by Rajaraja and Saktivarman was placed on the throne of Vengi as a viceroy of the Chola Dynasty. After the withdrawal of the Chola army, Bhima captured Kanchi in 1001 CE. Rajaraja expelled and killed the Andhra king called Bhima before re-establishing Saktivarman I on the throne of Vengi again. Rajaraja gave his daughter Kundavai in marriage to his next viceroy of Vengi Vimaladitya which brought about the union of the Chola Dynasty and the Eastern Chalukya Kingdom and which also ensured that the descendants of Rajaraja would rule the Eastern Chalukya kingdom in the future.

Hoysala conflicts 
There were encounters between the Cholas and the Hoysalas, who were vassals of the Western Chalukyas. An inscription from the Gopalakrishna temple at Narasipur dated to 1006 records that Rajaraja's general Aprameya killed minister Naganna and other generals of the Hoysalas. A similar inscription in Channapatna also describes Rajaraja defeating the Hoysalas.

Kalinga conquest 

The invasion of the kingdom of Kalinga occurred after the conquest of Vengi.

Conquest of Kuda-malai-nadu 
There are multiple references to the conquest of "Kuda-malai-nadu" by king Rajaraja (from c. 1000 CE onwards). The term Kudagu-malai-nadu is substituted in place of Kuda-malai-nadu in some of the inscriptions found in Karnataka and this region has been generally identified with Coorg (Kudagu).

It is said that the king conquered Malainadu for the sake of messengers in one day after crossing 18 mountain passes (Vikrama Chola Ula). Kulottunga Chola Ula makes reference to Rajaraja cutting off 18 heads and setting fire to Udagai. Kalingathupparani mentions the institution of Chadaya Nalvizha in Udiyar Mandalam, the capture of Udagai, and the plunder of several elephants from there. Tiruppalanam inscription (999 CE) mentions the gift of an idol by king from the booty obtained in Malainadu.

Naval expedition 

One of the last conquests of Rajaraja was the naval conquest of the islands of Maldives ("the Ancient Islands of the Sea Numbering 1200").  The naval campaign was a demonstration of the Chola naval power in the Indian Ocean.

The Cholas controlled the area around of Bay of Bengal with Nagapattinam as the main port. The Chola Navy also had played a major role in the invasion of Sri Lanka. The success of Rajaraja allowed his son Rajendra Chola to lead the Chola invasion of Srivijaya, carrying out naval raids in South-East Asia and briefly occupying Kadaram.

Personal life 

Rajaraja married a number of women, some of whom were Vanavan Madevi aka Thiripuvāna Mādēviyār, Dantisakti Vitanki aka Lokamadevi, Panchavan Madeviyar, Chola Mahadevi, Trailokya Mahadevi, Lata Mahadevi, Prithvi Mahadevi, Meenavan Mahadevi, Viranarayani and Villavan Mahadevi. He had at least three daughters. He had two sons, elder one is Rajendra with Thiripuvāna Mādēviyār and younger one is Araiyan Rajarajan (Mother unknown).He had his first daughter Kundavai with Lokamadevi. Kundavai married Chalukya prince Vimaladithan. He had two other daughters named Mathevadigal and Ģangamādevi or Arumozhi Chandramalli. Rajaraja died in 1014 CE in the Tamil month of Maka and was succeeded by Rajendra Chola I.

Administration 

Before the reign of Rajaraja I, parts of the Chola territory were ruled by hereditary lords and princes who were in a loose alliance with the Chola rulers. Rajaraja initiated a project of land survey and assessment in 1000 CE which led to the reorganization of the empire into units known as valanadus. From the reign of Rajaraja I until the reign of Vikrama Chola in 1133 CE, the hereditary lords and local princes were either replaced or turned into dependent officials. This led to the king exercising a closer control over the different parts of the empire. Rajaraja strengthened the local self-government and installed a system of audit and control by which the village assemblies and other public bodies were held to account while retaining their autonomy. To promote trade, he sent the first Chola mission to China.

His elder sister Kundavai assisted him in administration and management of temples.

Officials 

Rajendra Chola I was made a co-regent during the last years of Rajaraja's rule. He was the supreme commander of the northern and north-western dominions. During the reign of Raja Chola, there was an expansion of the administrative structure leading to the increase in the number of offices and officials in the Chola records than during earlier periods. Villavan Muvendavelan, one of the top officials of Rajaraja figures in many of his inscriptions. The other names of officials found in the inscriptions are the Bana prince Narasimhavarman, a general Senapathi Krishnan Raman, the Samanta chief Vallavaraiyan Vandiyadevan, the revenue official Irayiravan Pallavarayan and Kuruvan Ulagalandan, who organised the country-wide land surveys.

Religious policy 

Rajaraja was a follower of Shaivism sect of Hinduism but he also dedicated several temples to Vishnu.

In the 11th century CE, the Chudamani Vihara, a Buddhist monastery, was built by the Sailendra king of Srivijaya Sri Mara Vijayattungavarman with the patronage of  Rajaraja I in Nagapattinam. It was named Chudamani or Chulamani Vihara after king Sri Mara's father. As per the small Leyden grant this Vihara was called Rajaraja-perumpalli during the time of Kulottunga I. Rajaraja dedicated the proceeds of the revenue from the village of Anaimangalam towards the upkeep of this Vihara.

Rajaraja called himself Shivapada Shekhara (IAST: Śivapāda Śekhara), literally, "the one who places his crown at the feet of Shiva".

Arts and architecture 

Rajaraja embarked on a mission to recover the hymns after hearing short excerpts of Thevaram in his court. He sought the help of Nambi Andar Nambi. It is believed that by divine intervention Nambi found the presence of scripts, in the form of cadijam leaves half eaten by white ants in a chamber inside the second precinct in Thillai Nataraja Temple, Chidambaram.  The brahmanas (Dikshitars) in the temple opposed the mission, but Rajaraja intervened by consecrating the images of the saint-poets through the streets of Chidambaram. Rajaraja thus became known as Tirumurai Kanda Cholan meaning one who saved the Tirumurai. In his work Nambiyandar Nambi Puranam alias Tirumurai Kanda Puranam, Nambi identifies his patron as Rasarasamannan-Abhayakula-sekharan, that is king Rajaraja, the best of the race of Abhaya. Thus far Shiva temples only had images of god forms, but after the advent of Rajaraja, the images of the Nayanar saints were also placed inside the temple.  Nambi arranged the hymns of three saint poets Sambandar, Appar and Sundarar as the first seven books, Manickavasagar's Tirukovayar and Tiruvacakam as the 8th book, the 28 hymns of nine other saints as the 9th book, the Tirumandiram of Tirumular as the 10th book, 40 hymns by 12 other poets as the 10th book, Tirutotanar Tiruvanthathi – the sacred anthathi of the labours of the 63 nayanar saints and added his own hymns as the 11th book. The first seven books were later called as Tevaram, and the whole Saiva canon, to which was added, as the 12th book, Sekkizhar's Periya Puranam (1135) is wholly known as Tirumurai, the holy book.  Thus Saiva literature which covers about 600 years of religious, philosophical and literary development.

No contemporary portrait or statue of Rajaraja survives; the bronze figure depicting Rajaraja at the Thanjavur temple is spurious and of late origin.

Brihadisvara Temple 

In 1010 CE, Rajaraja built the Brihadisvara Temple in Thanjavur dedicated to Lord Shiva. The temple and the capital acted as a center of both religious and economic activity. It is also known as Periya Kovil, RajaRajeswara Temple and Rajarajeswaram. It is one of the largest temples in India and is an example of Dravidian architecture during the Chola period. The temple turned 1000 years old in 2010. The temple is part of the UNESCO World Heritage Site known as the "Great Living Chola Temples", with the other two being the Gangaikonda Cholapuram and Airavatesvara temple.

The Kumbam (the apex or the bulbous structure on the top) of the temple is carved out of a single rock and weighs around 80 tons. There is a big statue of Nandi (sacred bull), carved out of a single rock measuring about 16 feet long and 13 feet high at the entrance. The entire temple structure is made out of granite, the nearest sources of which are about 60 km to the west of temple. The temple is one of the most visited tourist attractions in Tamil Nadu.

Coins 

Before the reign of Rajaraja the Chola coins had on the obverse the tiger emblem and the fish and bow emblems of the Pandya and Chera Dynasties and on the reverse the name of the King. But during the reign of Rajaraja appeared a new type of coins. The new coins had on the obverse the figure of the standing king and on the reverse the seated goddess. The coins spread over a great part of South India and were also copied by the kings of Sri Lanka.

Inscriptions 

Due to Rajaraja's desire to record his military achievements, he recorded the important events of his life in stones. An inscription in Tamil from Mulbagal in Karnataka shows his accomplishments as early as the 19th year. An excerpt from such a Meikeerthi, an inscription recording great accomplishments, follows:

Rajaraja recorded all the grants made to the Thanjavur temple and his achievements. He also preserved the records of his predecessors. An inscription of his reign found at Tirumalavadi records an order of the king to the effect that the central shrine of the Vaidyanatha temple at the place should be rebuilt and that, before pulling down the walls, the inscriptions engraved on them should be copied in a book. The records were subsequently re-engraved on the walls from the book after the rebuilding was finished.

Another inscription from Gramardhanathesvara temple in South Arcot district dated in the seventh year of the king refers to the fifteenth year of his predecessor that is Uttama Choladeva described therein as the son of Sembiyan-Madeviyar.

In popular culture 

Ponniyin Selvan: I, a 2022 film based on Kalki Krishnamurthy's 1955 novel Ponniyin Selvan, Raja Raja Cholan (Arunmozhi Varman) role is played by the Tamil cinema actor Jayam Ravi.
Rajaraja Cholan, a 1973 Tamil film starring Sivaji Ganesan.
Ponniyin Selvan by Kalki revolves around the life of Rajaraja, the mysteries surrounding the assassination of Aditya Karikalan and the subsequent accession of Uttama to the Chola throne.
Nandipurathu Nayagi by Vembu Vikiraman revolves around the ascension of Uttama Chola to the throne and Rajaraja's naval expedition.
Rajaraja Cholan by Kathal Ramanathan.
Kandalur Vasantha Kumaran Kathai by Sujatha which deal with the situations leading Rajaraja to invade Kandalur.
Rajakesari and Cherar Kottai by Gokul Seshadri deal with the Kandalur invasion and its after-effects.
 Bharat Ek Khoj, a 1988 historical drama in its episodes 22 and 23 portrays Raj Raja Chola.
Kaviri Mainthan, a 2007 novel by Anusha Venkatesh.
Udayaar, a book by Tamil author Balakumaran which deals with RajaRaja's later years and Rajendra Chola I's ascension.

See also 
List of Tamil monarchs

References

Bibliography

External links 
 

Chola kings
Chola dynasty
Indian Shaivites
Hindu monarchs
10th-century Indian monarchs
11th-century Indian monarchs
940s births
1014 deaths
Year of birth uncertain
10th-century Hindus
11th-century Hindus